The Buffalo Bandits are a lacrosse team based in Buffalo, New York playing in the National Lacrosse League (NLL). The 2016 season was their twenty-fifth season in the NLL.

The Bandits had their best season in years, finishing with a franchise-record 13 wins. The 13-5 record gave the team first place in the East Division and also clinched first seed for the playoffs. The team only lost two games in a row once and finished the season winning 9 of their last 10 games.

Buffalo beat New England 2 games to 0 in the semifinals, but lost two close games to the Saskatchewan Rush in the Championship. 

The team was led by Dhane Smith, who had one of the best offensive years in NLL history. Smith set new records for both goals in a season with 72 and points in a season with 137.

Regular season

Final standings

Game log
Reference:

Playoffs

Roster

Transactions

Trades

Entry Draft
The 2015 NLL Entry Draft took place on September 28, 2015. The Bandits made the following selections:

See also
2016 NLL season

References

Buffalo
Buffalo Bandits seasons
Buffalo Bandits